Liu En-hung (born 16 March 1966) is a Taiwanese badminton player. He competed in the men's singles tournament at the 1996 Summer Olympics. He is the 2015 Men's doubles world senior champion in 45+ category.

References

External links
 

1966 births
Living people
Taiwanese male badminton players
Olympic badminton players of Taiwan
Badminton players at the 1996 Summer Olympics
Place of birth missing (living people)